William Coddington (c. 1601–1678) was a magistrate of the Massachusetts Bay Colony and later of the Colony of Rhode Island and Providence Plantations.

William Coddington may also refer to:

Sir William Coddington, 1st Baronet (1830–1918), English cotton manufacturer and politician
William Coddington Jr. (1651–1689), governor of the Colony of Rhode Island and Providence Plantations

See also
Coddington (disambiguation)